Ricardo Frederico Rodrigues Antunes (born January 1, 1974) is a former Brazilian football player.

Club statistics

References

External links

Kawasaki Frontale

1974 births
Living people
Brazilian footballers
Brazilian expatriate footballers
J2 League players
Kawasaki Frontale players
Expatriate footballers in Japan
Association football midfielders